Allium taishanense is a plant species endemic to the Shandong region of China. It occurs there on hillsides at elevations of 300–600 m.

Allium taishanense has narrow bulbs usually less than 5 mm in diameter. Scape is up to 30 cm tall, 2-angled with small teeth along the angles. Leaves are flat, up to 10 mm wide, tapering at both ends, usually shorter than the scape. Umbel is hemispheric, with many pink or white flowers crowded together.

References

taishanense
Onions
Flora of China
Flora of Shandong
Plants described in 1980